In mathematics, particularly in differential topology, there are two Whitney embedding theorems, named after Hassler Whitney:

The strong Whitney embedding theorem states that any smooth real -dimensional manifold (required also to be Hausdorff and second-countable) can be smoothly embedded in the real -space, if . This is the best linear bound on the smallest-dimensional Euclidean space that all -dimensional manifolds embed in, as the real projective spaces of dimension  cannot be embedded into real -space if  is a power of two (as can be seen from a characteristic class argument, also due to Whitney).
The weak Whitney embedding theorem states that any continuous function from an -dimensional manifold to an -dimensional manifold may be approximated by a smooth embedding provided .  Whitney similarly proved that such a map could be approximated by an immersion provided . This last result is sometimes called the Whitney immersion theorem.

A little about the proof
The general outline of the proof is to start with an immersion  with transverse self-intersections. These are known to exist from Whitney's earlier work on the weak immersion theorem. Transversality of the double points follows from a general-position argument. The idea is to then somehow remove all the self-intersections. If  has boundary, one can remove the self-intersections simply by isotoping  into itself (the isotopy being in the domain of ), to a submanifold of  that does not contain the double-points. Thus, we are quickly led to the case where  has no boundary. Sometimes it is impossible to remove the double-points via an isotopy—consider for example the figure-8 immersion of the circle in the plane. In this case, one needs to introduce a local double point. Since  is simply connected, one can assume this path bounds a disc, and provided  one can further assume (by the weak Whitney embedding theorem) that the disc is embedded in  such that it intersects the image of  only in its boundary. In the case of the figure-8 immersion with its introduced double-point, the push across move is quite simple (pictured). This process of eliminating opposite sign double-points by pushing the manifold along a disc is called the Whitney Trick.

To introduce a local double point, Whitney created immersions  which are approximately linear outside of the unit ball, but containing a single double point.  For  such an immersion is given by

Notice that if  is considered as a map to  like so:

then the double point can be resolved to an embedding:

For an embedding into , for example, define

This process ultimately leads one to the definition:

where

Moreover, for  large, it is approximately the linear embedding .

Eventual consequences of the Whitney trick
The Whitney trick was used by Stephen Smale to prove the h-cobordism theorem; from which follows the Poincaré conjecture in dimensions , and the classification of smooth structures on discs (also in dimensions 5 and up). This provides the foundation for surgery theory, which classifies manifolds in dimension 5 and above.

Given two oriented submanifolds of complementary dimensions in a simply connected manifold of dimension ≥ 5, one can apply an isotopy to one of the submanifolds so that all the points of intersection have the same sign.

History

The occasion of the proof by Hassler Whitney of the embedding theorem for smooth manifolds is said (rather surprisingly) to have been the first complete exposition of the manifold concept precisely because it brought together and unified the differing concepts of manifolds at the time: no longer was there any confusion as to whether abstract manifolds, intrinsically defined via charts, were any more or less general than manifolds extrinsically defined as submanifolds of Euclidean space.  See also the history of manifolds and varieties for context.

Sharper results
Whitney's strong embedding theorem states that . For  we have , as the circle and the Klein bottle show. More generally, for  we have , as the -dimensional real projective space show. Whitney's result can be improved to  unless  is a power of 2. This is a result of André Haefliger and Morris Hirsch (for ) and C. T. C. Wall (for ); these authors used important preliminary results and particular cases proved by Hirsch, William S. Massey, Sergey Novikov and Vladimir Rokhlin. At present the function  is not known in closed-form for all integers (compare to the Whitney immersion theorem, where the analogous number is known).

Restrictions on manifolds
One can strengthen the results by putting additional restrictions on the manifold. For example, the -sphere always embeds in  – which is the best possible (closed -manifolds cannot embed in ).

For  a power of 2 this is a result of André Haefliger and Morris Hirsch (for ), and Fuquan Fang (for ); these authors used important preliminary results proved by Jacques Boéchat and Haefliger, Simon Donaldson, Hirsch and William S. Massey. Haefliger proved that if  is a compact -dimensional -connected manifold, then  embeds in  provided .

Isotopy versions
A relatively 'easy' result is to prove that any two embeddings of a 1-manifold into R4 are isotopic. This is proved using general position, which also allows to show that any two embeddings of an -manifold into  are isotopic. This result is an isotopy version of the weak Whitney embedding theorem.

This result is an isotopy version of the strong Whitney embedding theorem.

As an isotopy version of his embedding result, Haefliger proved that if  is a compact -dimensional -connected manifold, then any two embeddings of  into  are isotopic provided . See further generalizations.

See also
 Representation theorem
 Whitney immersion theorem
 Nash embedding theorem
 Takens's theorem
 Nonlinear dimensionality reduction

Notes

References

External links

 Classification of embeddings

Theorems in differential topology